Walsh Middle School may refer to:
 Walsh Middle School, Framingham Public School District, Framingham, Massachusetts
 James Garland Walsh Middle School, Round Rock Independent School District, Round Rock, Texas